Tornimäe Building Complex is a two-building complex skyscraper in Tallinn, Estonia.

One building is designed for the hotel (Swissôtel Tallinn) and the other part is built for the apartments. The apartment building has 181 apartments. The height of the hotel is 117 m and the height of the apartment building is some centimetres shorter.

The complex was built from 2004 to 2007. The complex was designed by Meeli Truu.

Gallery

References

External links
 Non-free image in Estonian Wikipedia

Buildings and structures in Tallinn
Skyscrapers in Estonia
Twin towers
2007 establishments in Estonia